Unicorn Steak is the first studio album by the Canadian rock band Die Mannequin, released on November 13, 2007 in Canada and March 4, 2008 in the United States.  Unicorn Steak is a compilation of Die Mannequin’s first two studio eps How To Kill and Slaughter Daughter with two new additional tracks "Empty's Promise (Early Demo)" and a cover of the Beatsteaks song "Hand In Hand".

Track listing
All songs written by Care Failure, except "Upside Down Cross" & "Fatherpunk" by Care Failure and Michael T. Fox.

"Do It or Die" – 3:36
"Saved By Strangers" – 3:24
"Upside Down Cross" – 3:55
"Lonely of a Woman" – 3:38
"Autumn Cannibalist" – 3:23
"Near the End" – 2:47
"Fatherpunk" – 3:13
"Donut Kill Self" – 4:31
"Empty's Promise"  [Early Demo]– 5:11
"Hand In Hand"  – 2:28
 Track 10 is "Open Season" on the American version.

Personnel
Die Mannequin
Care Failure – lead vocals, guitar, bass
Anthony "Useless" Bleed – bass
Pat M. – drums, percussion

Technical staff and artwork
Tracks 1&2 Produced by Ian D'Sa
Tracks 3&4 Produced by Junior Sanchez.
Tracks 1&2 Recorded by Eric Ratz & Kenny Luong
Tracks 3&4 Recorded by Ray Martin assisted by Jeff Pelletier
Tracks 1-4 Mixed by Eric Ratz
Tracks 5-8 Produced, recorded & mixed by MSTRKRFT
Track 9 Recorded & mixed by Krisjan Leslie
Track 9 Recorded & mixed by Eric Ratz & Kenny Luong
Mastered by Noah Mintz
Art by B. Bergerson & D. Appleby for Think Tank Creative
Photography by Ivan Otis

Release history

See also
Die Mannequin

External links
Official website
Myspace

2007 compilation albums
Die Mannequin albums